East and North Hertfordshire NHS Trust was created in April 2000, by merger of the former East Hertfordshire and North Hertfordshire NHS trusts. It runs Lister Hospital, Mount Vernon Cancer Centre, the New QEII Hospital, Hertford County Hospital, Bedford Dialysis Unit and Harlow Renal Unit.

The Trust took over the Lister Surgicentre from Clinicenta, a subsidiary of Carillion in September 2013 after the centre was severely criticised by the Care Quality Commission and local MPs. The revenue cost of the take over to the Trust is said to be £2.3 million. The Department of Health paid £53 million for the premises.

Performance

The trust’s best performance since it was founded, achieving virtually every national clinical, operational and financial standard set was during 2010/11.  Trust chief executive Nick Carver said: “Patients coming to our hospitals today now have a shorter wait for their treatment than in previous years, are unlikely to have their procedure cancelled at the last minute and will be discharged as planned. The chances of their becoming infected with something like MRSA or Clostridium difficile have plummeted, and the quality and range of clinical services provided through our hospitals has improved considerably.”

It spent 7.8% of its total turnover on agency staff in 2014/5.

In the last quarter of 2015 it had one of the worst performances of any hospital in England against the four hour waiting target.

It ended 2015/6 in deficit of £16 million.

It was fined a total of £605,000 under the Late Payment of Commercial Debts (Interest) Act 1998 from 2014-7.

In October 2019 a group of experts reported to health leaders that, due to dilapidated buildings, obsolete equipment and a lack of staff, at Mount Vernon Cancer Centre  patients were unsafe and the quality of care was uncertain.  It is planned to be taken over by University College London Hospitals NHS Foundation Trust in April 2021.

See also
 Healthcare in Hertfordshire
 List of NHS trusts

References

External links 
 
 CQC inspection reports

NHS hospital trusts
Health in Hertfordshire